The Military Aircraft HM-1, derived from the earlier Hawks Miller HM-1 racing aircraft nicknamed, "Time Flies" was an American prototype attack/observation aircraft. The HM-1 did not achieve production after the sole example was destroyed during testing.

Design and development
In 1936, Frank Hawks had approached Howell W. "Pete" Miller, chief engineer for the Granville Brothers and responsible for their famous Gee Bee racers, to create a racing aircraft from his own design, the Hawks Miller HM-1. With an advanced aircraft design that still relied heavily on wood construction, the HM-1 featured innovative design elements, including the unusual feature of "burying" the cockpit with a curved windshield contoured to fit the fuselage top, creating a very streamlined shape. The cockpit was extended for takeoff and landing, but retracted in flight, with the pilot's seat lowered and the windshield becoming flush with the fuselage. 

After its first flight on October 18, 1936, Hawks flew "Time Flies", from Hartford, Connecticut, to Miami, Florida, on April 13, 1937, in 4 hours and 55 minutes. He then flew to Newark Airport, New Jersey, in 4 hours and 21 minutes, but bounced on landing at Newark, and broke a wooden spar in the right wing with other spars also damaged.

Short of funds, Hawks decided not to rebuild the aircraft and sold the rights to the design, including engineering data to Tri-American Aviation, a concern that wanted to convert the design into a fast two-seat attack/observation aircraft. The aircraft was redesigned to include two machine guns in the wings and another machine gun mounted in a flexible mount in the new rear cockpit.

Operational history
The principals of Tri-American Aviation, Leigh Wade and Edward Connerton, engaged Miller to rebuild the aircraft in 1938 as a two-seater with a more conventional greenhouse canopy added, looking a great deal like Miller's earlier Gee Bee Q.E.D. design. The aircraft was first renamed the Miller HM-2, but when company was reorganized as the Miller Aircraft Co., it was called the MAC-1 and Military Aircraft HM-1, although often described in the press as the "Hawks Military Racer", although Hawks was no longer actively involved.

With the intention to demonstrate the aircraft's potential, pilot Leigh Wade entered the MAC-1/HM-1 in the 1938 Thompson Trophy race.  In essentially military configuration with dummy machine guns fitted, Wade flew the aircraft to a fourth-place finish.

Despite the showing in the Thompson race, the U.S. military considered the predominantly wood construction in the design as unsuitable. Air racer and test pilot Earl Ortman was hired to fly the HM-1 at East Hartford, Connecticut where a  course was laid out to display flight capabilities for foreign military interests, and seek out military contracts.

On August 23, 1938, Ortman flew above Rentschler Field, adjacent to the Pratt & Whitney Aircraft factory where their employees and Hamilton Standard technicians were available. The next phase of the testing called for determination of climb rates. From 1,000 ft (304.93 m), Ortman climbed to 10,000 ft (3,048 m), then to dive down to 1,000 ft (304.93 m) and start up on another climb.

On his final dive, at a reported , the fuel in tanks was being transferred when the stresses placed on the wings were too great and a wing sheared off. Ortman was able to bail out safely, but the aircraft was demolished and the project was abandoned.

Specifications (Military Aircraft HM-1)

References

Notes

Citations

Bibliography

 Boyne, Walt. "Built for Speed: Pt. II of the Howell Miller Legend." Wings, Vol. 8, No. 2, April 78.
 Cowin, Hugh W. The Risk Takers, A Unique Pictorial Record 1908-1972: Racing & Record-setting Aircraft (Aviation Pioneer 2). London: Osprey Aviation, 1999. .
 Daniels, C.M. "Speed: The Story of Frank Hawks." Air Classics, Vol. 6, No. 2, December 1969.
 "Frank Hawks Obituary." Lima News, Lima, Ohio, August 24, 1938.
 Fraser, Chelsea Curtis. Famous American Flyers (Flight, Its First Seventy-five Years). Manchester, New Hampshire: Ayer Company Publishers Inc., 1979. .
 Hull, Robert. September Champions: The Story of America's Air Racing Pioneers. Harrisburg, Pennsylvania: Stackpole Books, 1979. .
 Kinert, Reed. American Racing Planes and Historic Air Races. New York: Wilcox and Follett Company, 1952.
 Kinert, Reed. Racing Planes and Air Races: A Complete History, Vol. 1 1909-1923. Fallbrook, California: Aero Publishers, Inc., 1969.
 Lewis, Peter. "Hawks HM-1 'Time Flies'." Air Pictorial, Volume 3, No. 11, November 1973.
 Matthews, Birch. Race With The Wind: How Air Racing Advanced Aviation. St. Paul, Minnesota: Motorbooks, 2001. .
 Musciano, Walter A. "Frank Hawks: The Story of the Legendary Speed Flying King." Aviation History, November 2005.

External links
 Model Aircraft magazine cover, May 1937
 The GEE BEE Story: Hottest Racers of The Time, Posted on September 30, 2011 by Col. Walter J. Boyne USAF (Ret) at The Surly Bonds of Earth
 Hawks on Aerofiles
 Miller on Aerofiles
 1938 National Air Races

Miller aircraft
1930s United States sport aircraft
1930s United States attack aircraft
Single-engined tractor aircraft
Low-wing aircraft
Racing aircraft
Aircraft first flown in 1936